William Whitton (9 July 1899 – 21 August 1983) was an English footballer who played for Chelsea and Tottenham Hotspur. A striker, Whitton played for Chelsea from 1923 to 1926. His best season at Chelsea was in the 1924–25 season, when he was the club's top scorer with 16 goals, which included a run of seven goals in two matches.

Notes

References

External links
 William Whitton profile at stamford-bridge.com

Chelsea F.C. players
Tottenham Hotspur F.C. players
English footballers
1899 births
1983 deaths
English Football League players
Association football forwards